Parliamentary elections were held in Syria on 9 and 10 November 1981. The result was a victory for the Arab Socialist Ba'ath Party, which won 127 of the 195 seats.

Results

References

Syria
1981 in Syria
Parliamentary elections in Syria
Election and referendum articles with incomplete results